Arkansas Time After Time (ATAT) is a Conway, Arkansas-based non-profit, all-volunteer civil rights and justice reform organization. It is funded by its members. It is a grassroots legislative advocacy group dedicated to making communities safer and upholding constitutional rights of those labelled sex offenders by advocating for fact-based, common-sense laws. ATAT is part of the growing movement to reform sex offender laws in the United States. The mission of this organization is to develop a cooperative sense of community rather than take an adversarial approach between people on the sex offender registry, victim's advocacy groups and the authorities in the state. Arkansas Time After Time is state affiliate of National RSOL, and one of the more than 50 organizations seeking to reform sex offender registration-related laws in US. Their name is reference to time those labelled as sex offenders have to serve under public registries and constantly changing requirements after serving their court imposed sentences.

Purpose
Arkansas Time After Time aims to educate law-makers and public that sex offenders are diverse group of individuals; that contrary to popular belief, general recidivism rate of 5% over 5 years is the second lowest of all offender groups; and that residency restrictions and public notification have no demonstrable effect on recidivism and might actually undermine public safety, thus making onerous restrictions and stigmatizing effect of public sex offender lists unfair and unfounded when applied broadly to all offenders without considering the individual risk and underlying facts of individual cases.

Arkansas Time After Time's goal is to help make communities safer and to protect children. In order to do this, it aims to educate the public and legislators to differentiate between those truly dangerous repeat violent sexual predators and those who at some time in their past committed a sex-related offense, served their sentence, completed or are currently undergoing treatment, and are working to re-integrate into society. ATAT holds that public registries have gone far beyond their original intent of protecting children and tracking violent sexual predators. It lobbies for fact based sex offender registry and policies to take account these differences instead of emotion based policies that may do more harm than good, and seeks to educate law-makers and the public of the stigma and other adverse effects some registrants and their families are unnecessarily experiencing due to current blanket policies. ATAT holds that current public registries are not effective and put registrants and their families in danger of vigilante attacks.

Advocacy
Arkansas Time After Time hosts a weekly radio show called "It Could Be You" on KABF 88.3fm. In 2013, the group testified against Senate Bill 12 aimed to restrict where some sex offenders are allowed to go, saying it would punish the children and other family members of the registrants. In February 2015, ATAT demanded local authorities to stop disclosing full addresses of registrants, when Arkansas law allows disclosing only block numbers. As a result of this campaign 17 of 24 local sheriff offices removed the full addresses from their web sites.

See also
Alliance for Constitutional Sex Offense Laws

Reform Sex Offender Laws, Inc.
Florida Action Committee
Advocates For Change
California Reform Sex Offender Laws
USA FAIR, Inc.
Illinois Voices for Reform
Michigan Citizens for Justice
Women Against Registry - W.A.R

References

External links
arkansastimeaftertime.org
Reform Sex Offender Laws, Inc.
Registrants and Families Support Line

Sex offender registration
Non-profit organizations based in Arkansas
Civil liberties advocacy groups in the United States